Radioville is an unincorporated community in Cass Township, Pulaski County, in the U.S. state of Indiana.

History
Radioville was named for a local amateur radio enthusiast.

For many years, the cultural center of Radioville and environs was a popular bowling alley and restaurant, known as Countryside Lanes, operated by local resident Bud Schroeder for over 40 years, from the early 1960s until his death in 2007.

Radioville was proposed to be established in October 1932 by Henry Ulrich. The planned community was to consist of homes, churches, schools and industry. Some bought lots and built homes but Ulrich's plan never evolved. The name is possibly derived from a procedure Ulrich performed called diathermy, a therapy using heat from condensed radio waves to relieve bone and muscle ailments. Residents also believe that radio broadcasting, including advertising for the Radioville community, and its developing popularity may have also encouraged the name. Today the community is not much more than a crossroads east of Pulaski.

Geography

References

Unincorporated communities in Pulaski County, Indiana
Unincorporated communities in Indiana